Konshevo is a rural locality (a village) in Yudinskoye Rural Settlement, Velikoustyugsky District, Vologda Oblast, Russia. The population was 2 as of 2002.

Geography 
Konshevo is located 5 km northeast of Veliky Ustyug (the district's administrative centre) by road. Dudino is the nearest rural locality.

References 

Rural localities in Velikoustyugsky District